This list of churches in Copenhagen lists church buildings in Copenhagen and Frederiksberg, Denmark.

Indre By

Amager

Bispebjerg

Brønshøj

Frederiksberg

Nørrebro

Østerbro

Valby

Vesterbro/Kongens Enghave

See also
 Listed buildings in Copenhagen Municipality

References

 
Churches
Copenhagen
Copenhagen